Padiyur  is a village in Thrissur district in the state of Kerala, India.
Irinjalakuda and Kodungallur are the nearest towns.

Demographics
 India census, Padiyur had a population of 9959 with 4682 males and 5277 females.

References

Villages in Mukundapuram Taluk